QuietRock is a brand of constrained-layer damped gypsum panels manufactured in Newark, California, by PABCO Gypsum. QuietRock was developed in 2003 by Kevin Surace and Brandon D. Tinianov, the first sound-reducing gypsum wallboard panel for use in the building construction industry. QuietRock panels are engineered to increase sound transmission loss (STL) performance and, consequently, the Sound Transmission Class (STC) rating for building partitions (both walls and ceilings) using sound and vibration theory.

Constrained-layer damping theory

Constrained layer damping (CLD) technology has been used since the early 1950s to reduce sound and vibration in various systems and materials—such as naval vehicles and airplane fuselages—but had not been applied as a treatment for sound isolation in buildings prior to 2003. QuietRock panels comprise several tuned constrained-layer systems that are optimized to reduce vibrational energy. This vibration reduction then translates to a decrease in the acoustic energy transmitted through the panel or assembly.

CLD panels differ from undamped monolithic panels in that they exhibit significant dynamic shifts (over frequency and temperature) in panel properties, such as the shear modulus and damping loss factor. These shifts affect the panel’s composite acoustic impedance in ways that dissipate the transmitted acoustic energy more efficiently than undamped panels. The most drastic differences in transmitted sound between damped and undamped panels occur at or near panel resonances and acoustic coincidence. The acoustic coincidence frequency is the frequency at which the acoustic wave number of incident sound is equal to the structural wave number of the panel.

Design
QuietRock panels are manufactured primarily from gypsum panels and viscoelastic polymers. Varying combinations of panels (as constraining-layers) are combined with one or more layers of viscoelastic polymer to create composite panels with varying thicknesses, from 1/2" to 1-3/8” (13 to 35 mm). All QuietRock panels are 4 feet wide (1.2 m) and are manufactured in various lengths.

All QuietRock panels are paper-faced and manufactured to meet applicable standards for the performance and finishing of gypsum panel products. QuietRock models (depending on the product) are designed to meet various building code requirements such as fire resistance, mold resistance, impact resistance, abrasion resistance, radio frequency mitigation, as well as environmental requirements such as low VOC (Volatile Organic Compound) emissions. Many QuietRock models have also been UL-certified for fire-resistance rated assemblies. As an example, the QuietRock 530 [5] model design includes a thin sheet of metal for added shear and impact resistance. Another example, QuietRock EZ-Snap (ES), was developed and released into the market in 2009 as the first CLD panel manufactured with no internal layers of paper. The purpose of this product was to reduce labor and installation time during building construction, as it allows panels to be scored-and-snapped like undamped monolithic gypsum wallboard.

QuietRock panels are primarily designed to treat noise in buildings by reducing the transmitted airborne sound between enclosed spaces. The transmission of airborne sound through building partitions (an important part of sound isolation) is measured, both in a laboratory and in situ (in the field), using standardized test methods., ASTM International Standards E90 Standard Test Method for Laboratory Measurement of Airborne Sound Transmission Loss of Building Partitions and Elements and E413 Classification for Rating Sound Insulation are used to measure the STL of partitions and then calculate the single-number STC rating, respectively. ASTM Standard E336 Standard Test Method for Measurement of Airborne Sound Attenuation between Rooms in Buildings is used to conduct field measurements of STL. Standard methodology, laboratory precision and accuracy, and manufacturing standards have changed over the years. Therefore, the STL and STC ratings cited in past publications may not accurately represent the sound isolation performance of products and assemblies today. Basing expectations of STL and STC performance on current test data is necessary because building designers and engineers rely on this information to meet building code and other requirements.

According to the thousands of current, standardized STL tests (both in laboratory conditions and in situ) conducted, the application of QuietRock panels to assembly designs results in a marked increase in STL that varies depending on panel installation and assembly design. Analyses of test results have shown dramatic improvements over undamped assemblies—sometimes upwards of 20 dB—within a broad range of 1/3rd octave band frequencies, but particularly at or near the coincidence frequency.

To help ensure achievement of the designed acoustical performance, sound isolation must expand beyond the gypsum panels—sound flanking must be addressed.

Uses and availability
QuietRock panels are applicable for any new construction or remodeling project where higher STL is the primary objective.

See also
 Soundproofing
 Acoustic transmission
 Noise barrier
 Noise pollution
 Noise regulation
 Noise, vibration, and harshness
 Clay panel

References

Acoustics
Noise control
Building materials